Beraki is an Eritrean first name and surname. Notable people with the name include:
 Beraki Beyene (born 1980), Eritrean long-distance runner
 Beraki Ghebreselassie, Eritrean politician
 Tsehaytu Beraki (1939–2018), Eritrean musician, poet and political activist, known for her singing and playing of the krar